Verdugo is a surname of Spanish origin. Verdugo means "butcher" or "executioner" in English. Notable people with the surname include:

Agustín Landa Verdugo (1923–2009), Mexican architect and urban planner
Alex Verdugo, (born 1996), American baseball player
Alonso Verdugo, 3rd Count of Torrepalma (1706–1767), Spanish count
Arnoldo Martínez Verdugo (born 1925), Mexican politician
Elena Verdugo (1925–2017), American actor
Francisco Verdugo (1537–1595), Spanish military commander
Gorka Verdugo (born 1978), Spanish cyclist
José María Verdugo (1751–1831), soldier of the Presidio of San Diego
Kevin Verdugo (born 1968), American football player and coach
Mariano Verdugo (1746–1822), Spanish soldier and mayor
Patricia Verdugo (1947–2008), Chilean journalist, writer and activist
Pedro Verdugo, 2nd Count of Torrepalma (1657–1720), Spanish count and academic
Ryan Verdugo (born 1987), American baseball player

Spanish-language surnames
Occupational surnames